John McGovern may refer to:

Sportspeople
John McGovern (American football) (1886–1963), American football quarterback for the University of Minnesota
John McGovern (footballer) (born 1949), European Cup winning captain
Johnny McGovern (1932–2022), Irish hurler

Others
John McGovern (politician) (1887–1968), British Independent Labour Party politician
John McGovern (VC) (1825–1888), Irish recipient of the Victoria Cross
John P. McGovern (1921–2007), Houston allergist, investor and philanthropist
Jonny McGovern (born 1975), comic
John McGovern (actor) (1902–1985), films include Kazan's Splendor in the Grass (1961) and Hitchcock's The Birds (1963)
Johnny McGovern (actor) (born 1936), actor in Peter Pan (1953 film)